Kieran Mulroney (born September 24, 1965) is an American actor known for his numerous television appearances. He is also a musician and screenwriter.

Early life
He was born on September 24, 1965, in Alexandria, Virginia, where he graduated from T. C. Williams High School. Kieran has four siblings. He has three older brothers, Conor, Sean, and fellow actor Dermot; and a younger sister, Moira.

Personal life
His brother is actor Dermot Mulroney. He is married to screenwriter and director Michele Mulroney.

Filmography

Television
 NCIS as Lt. Reynolds
 Judging Amy as Mr. Sinkler
 The Guardian as Robert Twain
 NYPD Blue as Andrew Sloin
 ER as Marty's Father
 Dead Man's Walk as Jimmy Tweed
 Seinfeld episode "The Implant" as Timmy, the character who rebukes George Costanza for double dipping a tortilla chip at a funeral reception
 Star Trek: The Next Generation episode "The Outrageous Okona"
 Star Trek: Enterprise episode "Fortunate Son"
 From the Earth to the Moon as astronaut Rusty Schweickart

Film
 Gettysburg as Maj. G. Moxley Sorrel
 Career Opportunities
 The Spitfire Grill as Joe Sperling
The Immortals

Writer
 Paper Man
 Sherlock Holmes: A Game of Shadows
 Power Rangers (story by)
 Geostorm

Director
Paper Man – Credited as director alongside Michele Mulroney

Producer
Wild Tigers I Have Known – Executive producer

References

External links
 

1965 births
Living people
American male television actors
Male actors from Alexandria, Virginia
T. C. Williams High School alumni